Ruth Fowler (aka Ruth Iorio) is a British-born Los Angeles and London based author, photographer, playwright screenwriter and journalist, who first came to media attention after writing several articles for The Village Voice as "Mimi".

Background

Fowler holds a first-class Honors Bachelor's degree in English Literature and a Master's degree in American literature from King's College, Cambridge. After graduating Cambridge, Fowler traveled to over fifty different countries working as a chef, a sailor, a bar-tender, a supermarket checkout girl and a waitress before finding herself in New York City in 2005. While attempting to obtain a work visa she worked as a stripper in Manhattan, writing about her experiences on her blog .

Career

As well as The Village Voice, she has written for The Guardian, The Observer, Wired Magazine, The New York Post, The Huffington Post, The Fix and The Norton Anthology For Creative Non Fiction. Her first book, No Man's Land, was published by Viking Penguin in June 2008, and was republished in May 2009 as Girl Undressed. In 2008 Ruth wrote the screenplay for the short film Supraman and the School of Necessity.

According to her agent, Ruth is currently writing her second book, and working on an adaptation of the award-winning ‘A Short History of Tractors in Ukrainian’ for Ruby Films and the BBC. She recently completed ‘Sparkleponies’ - a feature film for Film 4, and ‘Boy2Girl’ with Kindle Entertainment. ‘Girl Undressed’ has been optioned as a TV series by BBC America and Big Talk productions. In 2011, Ruth was selected as one of 12 writers taking part in a Channel 4 Screenwriting Workshop, working
with a script-editor on an original pilot for a television series or serial. Ruth's original political screenplay 'Fly Me' ensured that Ruth was selected as a Screen International Stars of Tomorrow 2012, alongside previous winners Emily Blunt, Carey Mulligan, Robert Pattison and Andrew Garfield.

Marriage and child

Fowler was married to the photographer Jared Iorio, and lives in Venice, California. In 2013, Fowler and her husband shared the experience of birthing her son at home via posts and pictures on social media.

Personal beliefs

Fowler is a staunch believer in universal free education.

References

External links

Year of birth missing (living people)
Living people
21st-century British screenwriters
21st-century British women writers
British emigrants to the United States
British bloggers
British women screenwriters
Writers from New York (state)
British women bloggers
Alumni of King's College, Cambridge
Writers from Los Angeles
People from Venice, Los Angeles
The Village Voice people